Antony may refer to:

 Antony (name), a masculine given name and a surname
 Antony, Belarus, a village in the Hrodna Voblast of Belarus
 Antony, Cornwall, a village in Cornwall, United Kingdom
 Antony House, Cornwall, United Kingdom
 Antony, Hauts-de-Seine, a commune in the Hauts-de-Seine département of France
 Antony station, a train station on the RER B line in Paris
 Antony (film)
 Antony (Khrapovitsky)
 Antony (footballer, born 2000) (Antony Matheus dos Santos), Brazilian footballer
 Antony (footballer, born 2001) (Antony Alves Santos), Brazilian footballer